McMichaels  is an unincorporated community in Chestnuthill Township in Monroe County, Pennsylvania, United States.

References

Unincorporated communities in Monroe County, Pennsylvania
Unincorporated communities in Pennsylvania